Medini Rai (died 1528) was a vassal of Sisodia king Rana Sanga. He ruled much of the Malwa under the lordship of Rana Sanga, who helped him in defeating Sultan of Malwa and conquering Malwa, Chanderi was his capital.

He joined the united Rajput Confederacy in fatal Battle of khanua with a garrison of 20,000 Rajput soldiers and headed the left wing of Rajputs to counter Babur's right wing. The conquest of Malwa shocked the court of Delhi as they were not expecting the Rajputs to invade Malwa. This led to several skirmishes and battles between the Lodi Empire and the Kingdom of Mewar. Medini Rai actively helped Rana Sanga in these battles and helped him score a series of victories. Rana Sanga's influence after the war extended to Pilia Khar, a river on the outskirts of Agra. He assisted Rana Sanga in many campaigns against the Sultans of India. Medini Rai was later killed in the Battle of Chanderi against the Mughal emperor Babur, where he was given a chance to surrender but chose to fight and remain loyal to the Rana.

References

Bibliography
 

Year of birth missing
1528 deaths
History of India
Mughal Empire

Indian warriors